Hydrocarbons are the leading sector in Algeria's mineral industry, which includes diverse but modest production of metals and industrial minerals. In 2006, helium production in Algeria accounted for about 13% of total world output. Hydrocarbons produced in Algeria accounted for about 2.9% of total world natural gas output and about 2.2% of total world crude oil output in 2006. Algeria held about 21% of total world identified resources of helium, 2.5% of total world natural gas reserves, and about 1% of total world crude oil reserves.

In 2019, the country was the 17th largest world producer of gypsum, and the 19th largest world producer of phosphate.

History
Some minerals, such as high-grade iron ore, phosphate, mercury, and zinc, have been exported since the early 1970s. The state mining and prospecting corporation, the National Company for Mineral Research and Exploration (Société Nationale de Recherches et d'Exploitations Minières), was established in 1967. As a result of the government's decentralization policy, the company was restructured in 1983 into separate production and distribution entities.

Legal framework
The mineral industry is managed primarily by the Ministère de l’Énergie et des Mines (Ministry of Energy and Mines) and subsidiary organizations, such as the Agence Nationale du Patrimoine Minier (ANPM) (National Agency for Mining Endowment). Processed mineral commodities, such as cement, fertilizers, and steel, are under the jurisdiction of the Ministère de l’Industrie et de la Restructuration (Ministry of Industry and Restructuring).

Nonfuel mineral operations were regulated by law No. 01-10 of July 3, 2001, and associated decrees. Natural gas and petroleum operations were regulated by law No. 05-07 of April 28, 2005. Environmental laws applicable to the mineral industry included law No. 03-10 of July 19, 2003, and associated decrees, and law No. 05-12 of September 4, 2005.

Economic impact
Revenue attributed to natural gas and petroleum production, processing, and sales activity accounted for 78% of 2006 government income. Hydrocarbon activity accounted for more than 33% of the nation's 2006 gross domestic product (GDP). The continued increase of international crude oil and natural gas prices resulted in a significant increase in the value of Algerian exports, most of which were shipped through the country's eight main seaports or exported by pipeline. In 2006, Algerian exports of goods and services were valued at $57.3 billion, of which hydrocarbons accounted for about $53.6 billion, compared with 2005, when exports of goods and services were valued at $48.8 billion, of which hydrocarbons accounted for about $45.6 billion. Other mineral commodity exports included base metals (about $206 million), iron and steel ($197 million), industrial minerals (about $52 million), and precious minerals (about $4 million).

About 28,000 people were employed in the mining sector, of which slightly less than one-half was in the private sector. Aggregate and stone production companies accounted for more than 60% of the mining sector workforce; clay production companies, 12%; phosphate production companies, 6%; and iron ore production companies, 5%.

Production
Several significant changes in production were posted in 2006. Mineral commodities with notable production increases included aggregate and crushed stone, barite, cement, dolomite, feldspar, iron ore, phosphate rock, salt, construction sand, and steel. Mineral commodities with notable production decreases included ammonia, gold, gypsum, helium, pozzolan, quartzite, silica sand, silver, and zinc.

Structure of the mineral industry
About 950 nonfuel mineral operations were active in Algeria in 2006, of which nearly 70% were aggregates, construction sand, or crushed stone operations. Private-sector companies dominated the aggregate, common clay, gypsum, and sand sectors. Large- and medium-sized public-sector enterprises dominated the ranks of barite, bentonite, cement, natural gas, petroleum, and phosphate rock producers. The joint ventures of private and state-owned companies dominated the gold production sector, the helium production sector (Helios s.p.a.), and the steel production sector (Mittal Steel Annaba s.p.a.).

In late 2006, the government offered to sell its majority interests in Société des Mines de Baryte d’Algérie s.p.a., Société des Diatomites d’Algérie s.p.a., and Société des Feldspaths d’Algérie s.p.a. [all of which were subsidiaries of state-owned Entreprise Nationale des Produits Miniers Non Ferreux & des Substances Utiles, s.p.a. (ENOF)]. In 2006, ENOF closed the Chabet El Hamra zinc mine, and Société des Kaolins d’Algérie s.p.a. (which was an ENOF subsidiary) closed the Djebel Debbagh kaolin pit.

Commodities
In 2006, about 300 exploration permits were in effect. Notable exploration and development and redevelopment contracts under negotiation included those with subsidiaries of the Mineral Resources Management Bureau of Henan Province, China for the Boukaïs copper prospect, the Boukhedma-Aïn Sedjra-Kef Semmah lead zinc prospects, the El Abed zinc prospect, the Guettara manganese prospect, and the Issefane gold prospect. Western Mediterranean Zinc s.p.a., which was a joint venture of Terramin Australia Ltd. (65% interest) and ENOF (35% interest), acquired the rights to explore the Oued Amizour zinc project.

Gold
The decline was attributed to the delayed delivery of equipment. Development of the Amesmessa Mine continued; production was expected to begin in 2007.

Lead, silver, and zinc
Assays of samples from a 5-hole drilling program at the Tan Chaffao deposit by Tan Chaffao Mining Co. S.A.R.L., which was a joint venture of Maghreb Minerals PLC of the United Kingdom (85% interest) and Gold and Industrial Minerals [GOLDIM] [which was a subsidiary of the Government-owned Office National de la Recherche Géologique et Minière (15%)] indicated less than expected mineralization.

In late 2006, Western Mediterranean Zinc began a drilling program on the Tala Hamza deposit of the Oued Amizour zinc project.

Helium and liquefied natural gas
In 2006, the testing of the Helison Production s.p.a. plant at the GL1K liquefied natural gas (LNG) facility in Skikda resulted in the plant's initial liquid helium production.

Petroleum and natural gas

Giant petroleum fields include the Hassi R'Mel gas field and the Hassi Messaoud oil field. High international crude oil and natural gas prices encouraged stepped-up exploration and development drilling in Algeria. The number of exploration wells drilled in 2006 increased to 77 compared with 64 in 2005 and 36 in 2001. The number of development wells drilled in 2006 increased to 208 compared with 161 in 2005 and 175 in 2001.

Existing and expected local and European high demand for oil and gas has resulted in the construction and planning of a number of pipelines in Algeria:

Oil pipelines
  to Algiers
 Haoud El Hamra to Bejaia
 Haoud El Hamra to Skikda
 Haoud El Hamra to Arzew
 In Amenas to Haoud El Hamra
 Rhourde El Bagel to Haoud El Hamra
 Trapsa oil Pipeline from Zarzaitine/Edjeleh to La Skhirra in Tunisia
 El Borma to La Skhirra in Tunisia

Gas pipelines
 Algiers to Arzew
 Annaba to Skikda
 Bejaia to Skikda
 Haoud El Hamra to Arzew
 Hassi Messaoud to Has si R'Mel
 Has si R'Mel to Skikda
 Has si R'Mel to Algiers
 Has si R'Mel to Arzew
 In Amenas to Hassi Messaoud
 In Salah to Has si R'Mel
 Part of Algeria-Italy Gas Pipeline via Sardinia from Has si R'Mel field to El Kala
 Maghreb–Europe Gas Pipeline from Has si R'Mel to Tarifa in Spain
 Medgaz from Beni Saf to Almeria in Spain
 El Borma to Gabes in Tunisia
 Trans-Mediterranean Pipeline, from Has si R'Mel to Bologna, Italy, transiting through Tunisia
 Algeria-Italy Gas Pipeline via Sardinia from El Kala to Cagliari (Sardinia) [proposed]
 Trans-Saharan Pipeline from Warri in Nigeria to Arzew [proposed]

Products pipelines
 Has si R'Mel to Eldoret
 Has si R'Mel to Hassi Messaoud

Outlook
Owing to its hydrocarbon resources and associated infrastructure and its location close to Europe (which was the major market for its minerals), Algeria's hydrocarbon sector is expected to continue to attract foreign direct investment. Continued high international commodity prices were expected to encourage continued domestic and international interest in the Government's program to partially divest its ownership interest in nonfuel mineral operations.

Successful mineral fuel and nonfuel mineral exploration could result in increased mineral commodity development opportunities. The government proposes to increase oil production (subject to production quotas of the OPEC) and to increase natural gas exports by 2010.

References

Mining in Algeria
Economy of Algeria
Algeria